Kathoey or katoey is an identity used by some people in Thailand, whose identities in English may be best described as transgender women in some cases, or effeminate gay men in other cases. A significant number of Thai people perceive kathoey as belonging to a separate sex, including some transgender women themselves.

In the face of the many sociopolitical obstacles that  navigate in Thailand,  activism has led to legal recognition as of January 2015.

Terminology 
The word  is of Khmer  . It is most often rendered as ladyboy in English conversation, an expression that has become popular across Southeast Asia.

General description 
Although  is often translated as 'transgender woman' in English, this term is not correct in Thailand. As well as transgender people, the term can refer to gay men, and was originally used to refer to intersex people. Before the 1960s, the use of  included anyone who deviated from the dominant sexual norms.

Australian scholar of sexual politics in Thailand Peter Jackson claims that the term  was used in antiquity to refer to intersex people, and that the connotation changed in the mid-20th century to cover cross-dressing males.  became an iconic symbol of modern Thai culture. The term can refer to males who exhibit varying degrees of femininity. Many dress as women and undergo "feminising" medical procedures such as breast implants, hormones, silicone injections, or Adam's apple reductions. Others may wear make-up and use feminine pronouns, but dress as men, and are closer to the Western category of effeminate gay man than transgender.

The term  may be considered pejorative, especially in the form . It has a meaning similar to the English language 'fairy' or 'queen'.  can also be seen as a derogatory word for those who are gay.

Religion 
Bunmi, a Thai Buddhist author, believes that homosexuality stems from "lower level spirits", a factor that is influenced by one's past life. Some Buddhists view  as persons born with a disability as a consequence of past sins. Using the notion of karma, some Thais believe that being a kathoey is the result of transgressions in past lives, concluding that kathoey deserve pity rather than blame. Others, however, believe that kathoeys should rectify their past life transgressions. This is done through merit-making such as "making donations to a temple or by ordaining as monks".

Requirements to confirm eligibility for gender-affirming surgery 

In Thai cities such as Bangkok, there are currently two to three gender-affirming surgery (GAS) operations per week, more than 3,500 over the past thirty years. With the massive increase in GASs, there has also been an increase in prerequisites, measures that must be taken in order to be eligible for the operation. Patients must be at least 18 years old with permission from parents if under 20 years old. One must provide evidence of diagnosis of gender dysphoria from a psychologist or psychiatrist. Before going through gender reassignment surgery, one must be on hormones/antiandrogens for at least one year. Patients must have a note from the psychiatrist or clinical psychologist. Two months prior to the surgery, patients are required to see a psychiatrist in Thailand to confirm eligibility for gender-affirming surgery.

Social context 
Kathoeys are more visible and more accepted in Thai culture than transgender people are in other countries in the world. Several popular Thai models, singers, and movie stars are kathoeys, and Thai newspapers often print photographs of the winners of female and kathoey beauty contests side by side. The phenomenon is not restricted to urban areas; there are kathoeys in most villages, and kathoey beauty contests are commonly held as part of local fairs.

A common stereotype is that older, well-off kathoey provide financial support to young men with whom they are in romantic relationships.

Kathoeys currently face many social and legal impediments. Families (and especially fathers) are typically disappointed if a child becomes a kathoey, and kathoeys often have to face the prospect of disclosing their birth sex. However, kathoey generally have greater acceptance in Thailand than most other East Asian countries. Problems can also arise in regards to access to amenities and gender allocation.

Employment 
Many kathoey work in predominately female occupations, such as in shops, restaurants, and beauty salons, but also in factories (a reflection of Thailand's high proportion of female industrial workers). Discrimination in employment is rampant as many perceive kathoeys as having mental problems and refuse to hire them. For this reason, many kathoeys are only able to find work in sex and entertainment industries. These sorts of jobs include tourist centers, cabarets, and sex work. Kathoeys who work in the tourism sector must conform to a physical image that is preferred by tourists.

Kathoeys who obtain jobs in the civil service sector are required to wear uniforms coinciding with their assigned sex of male.

Education 
Many schools teach students that being transgender is wrong and a form of sexual deviancy. Thai schools utilize gendered uniforms as well. In 2015, Bangkok University revised its uniform guidelines to allow transgender students to wear the uniform of their preferred gender, however, many other institutions still force transgender students to wear the uniform that matches their assigned sex.

Political context 
Thailand's 2015 Gender Equality Act is currently the strongest legal tool for advocating for transgender rights. It protects those who are "of a different appearance from his/her own sex by birth" from unfair gender discrimination. Prior to the creation of the 2016 Thai constitution, people believed that anti-discrimination terms would be set for a new category called 'third gender'. This term, however, was missing from the new constitution and no protections for transgender people were specifically outlined. Instead, the constitution prohibited "unjust discrimination" based on differences in sex.

Identification documents 
Legal recognition of kathoeys and transgender people is nonexistent in Thailand: even if a transgender person has had sex reassignment surgery, they are not allowed to change their legal sex on their identification documents. Identification documents are particularly important for daily life in Thailand as they facilitate communication with businesses, bureaucratic agencies (i.e., signing up for educational courses or medical care), law enforcement, etc. The primary identification form used in Thailand is The Thai National Identification Card, which is used for many important processes such as opening a bank account. The vast majority of transgender people are unable to change these documents to reflect their chosen gender, and those who are allowed must uphold strict standards. Transgender individuals are often accused of falsifying documents and are forced to show their identification documents. This threatens their safety and results in their exclusion from various institutions like education or housing. Impeded by these identity cards on a daily basis, transsexuals are "outed" by society.

The criminal justice sector relies on identification cards when deciding where to detain individuals. This means that kathoeys are detained alongside men. By law, women are not allowed to be detained alongside men, and since kathoeys are not legally classified as women, they reside in the male section in prison. Within prison, kathoeys are forced to cut their hair and abide by strict rules governing gender expression. Additionally, they are denied access to hormones and other "transition-related health care".

Military draft 
Transgender individuals were automatically exempted from compulsory military service in Thailand. Kathoeys were deemed to suffer from "mental illness" or "permanent mental disorder". These mental disorders were required to appear on their military service documents, which are accessible to future employers. In 2006, the Thai National Human Rights Commission (NHRC) overturned the use of discriminatory phraseology in Thailand's military service exemption documents. With Thai law banning citizens from changing their sex on their identification documents, everyone under the male category must attend a "lottery day" where they are randomly selected to enlist in the army for two years. In March 2008, the military added a "third category" for transgender people that dismissed them from service due to "illness that cannot be cured within 30 days". In 2012, the Administrative Court ruled that the Military and Defense needed to revise the reasoning for their exemption of kathoeys from the military. As such, kathoeys are now exempt from the military under the reasoning that their "gender does not match their sex at birth".

Performance

Representation in cinema 
 began to gain prominence in the cinema of Thailand during the late-1980s. The depiction at first was negative by showing  suffering bad karma, suicide, and abandoned by straight lovers. Independent and experimental films contributed to defying sexual norms in gay cinema in the 1990s. The 2000 film The Iron Ladies, directed by Yongyoot Thongkongtoon, depicted a positive portrayal of an almost entirely  volleyball team by displaying their confidence. The rising middle-class in Bangkok and vernacular queer culture made the mainstream portrayal of kathoeys more popular on television and in art house cinemas.

Miss Tiffany's Universe 
Feminine beauty in Thailand allowed transgender people to have their own platform where they are able to challenge stereotypes and claim cultural recognition. Miss Tiffany's Universe is a beauty contest that is opened to all transgender women. Beginning in 1998, the pageant takes place every year in Pattaya, Thailand during May. With over 100 applicants, the pageant is considered to be one of the most popular transgender pageants in the world. Through beauty pageants, Thailand has been able to promote the country's cosmetic surgery industry, which has had a massive increase in medical tourism for sex reassignment surgery. According to the Miss Tiffany's Universe website, the live broadcast attracts record of fifteen million viewers. The winner of the pageant receives a tiara, sash, car, grand prize of 100,000 baht (US$3,000), equivalent to an annual wage for a Thai factory worker. The assistant manager director, Alisa Phanthusak, stated that the pageant wants  to be visible and to treat them as normal. It is the biggest annual event in Pattaya.

Transgender beauty contests are found in the countryside at village fairs or festivals. All-male revues are common in gay bars in Bangkok and as drag shows in the tourist resort of Pattaya.

Recent developments 

In 1993, Thailand's teacher training colleges implemented a semi-formal ban on allowing homosexual (which included ) students enrolling in courses leading to qualification for positions in kindergartens and primary schools. In January 1997, the Rajabhat Institutes (the governing body of the colleges) announced it would formalize the ban, which would extend to all campuses at the start of the 1997 academic year. The ban was quietly rescinded later in the year, following the replacement of the Minister of Education.

Among the most famous  in Thailand is Nong Tum, a former champion Thai boxer who emerged into the public eye in 1998. She would present in a feminine manner and had commenced hormone therapy while still a popular boxer; she would enter the ring with long hair and make-up, occasionally kissing a defeated opponent. She announced her retirement from professional boxing in 1999 – undergoing genital reassignment surgery, while continuing to work as a coach, and taking up acting and modeling. She returned to boxing in 2006.

The school's fifteen  students were required to wear male clothing at school but were allowed to sport feminine hairdos. The restroom featured four stalls, but no urinals.

Following the 2006 Thai coup d'état,  are hoping for a new third sex to be added to passports and other official documents in a proposed new constitution. In 2007, legislative efforts have begun to allow  to change their legal sex if they have undergone genital reassignment surgery; this latter restriction was controversially discussed in the community.

Bell Nuntita, a contestant of the Thailand's Got Talent TV show, became a YouTube hit when she first performed singing as a girl and then switched to a masculine voice.

Advocacy

Activism  
Thai activists have mobilized for over two decades to secure sexual diversity rights. Beauty pageant winner Yollada Suanyot, known as Nok, founded the Trans Female Association of Thailand on the basis of changing sex-designation on identification cards for post-operative transsexual women. Nok promoted the term  instead of  but was controversial because of its connotation with gender identity disease. The goal of the Thai Transgender Alliance is to delist gender dysphoria from international psychological diagnostic criteria and uses the term  to advocate for transgender identity. A common protest sign during sexual rights marches is  meaning "Kathoey are not mentally ill".

Activism in Thailand is discouraged if it interferes with official policy. In January 2006, the Thai Network of People Living With HIV/AIDS had their offices raided after demonstrations against Thai-US foreign trade agreements. Under the Thai Constitution of 1997, the right to be free of discrimination based on health conditions helped to minimize the stigma against communities living with HIV/AIDS. In most cases, governments and their agencies fail to protect transgender people against these exclusions. There is a lack of HIV/AIDS services for specifically transgender people and feminizing hormones largely go without any medical monitoring.

Trans prejudice has produced discriminatory behaviors that have led to the exclusion of transgender people from economic and social activity. World-wide, transgender people face discrimination amongst family members, religious settings, education, and the work-place. Accepted mainly in fashion-related jobs or show business, people who are transgender are discriminated against in the job market and have limited job opportunities.  have also experienced ridicule from coworkers and tend to have lower salaries. Long-term unemployment reduces the chances of contributing to welfare for the family and lowers self-esteem, causing a higher likelihood of prostitution in specialized ladyboy bars. Harassment from the police is evident especially for  who work on the streets.  may be rejected in official contexts being rejected entry or services.

Anjaree is one of Thailand's gay feminist organizations, established in mid-1986 by women's right activists. The organization advocated wider public understanding of homosexuality based on the principles of human rights. The first public campaign opposing sexual irregularity was launched in 1996.

Social spaces are often limited for  even if Thai society does not actively persecute them. Indigenous Thai cultural traditions have given a social space for sexual minorities. In January 2015, the Thai government announced it would recognize the third sex in its constitution in order to ensure all sexes be treated equally under the law.

In popular culture 
The first all- music group in Thailand was formed in 2006. It is named "Venus Flytrap" and was selected and promoted by Sony BMG Music Entertainment. "The Lady Boys of Bangkok" is a  revue that has been performed in the UK since 1998, touring the country in both theatres and the famous "Sabai Pavilion" for nine months each year.

Ladyboys, also a popular term used in Thailand when referring to transgender women, was the title of a popular documentary in the United Kingdom, where it was aired on Channel 4 TV in 1992 and was directed by Jeremy Marre. Marre aimed to portray the life of two adolescent  living in rural Thailand, as they strove to land a job at a cabaret revue in Pattaya.

In series 1, episode 3 of British sitcom I'm Alan Partridge, the protagonist Alan Partridge frequently mentions ladyboys, seemingly expressing a sexual interest in them.

Thai  style and fashion has largely borrowed from Korean popular culture.

"Uncle Go Paknam" 
"Uncle Go Paknam", created by Pratchaya Phanthathorn, is a popular non-heterosexual advice column that first appeared in 1975 in a magazine titled , meaning 'strange'. Through letters and responses it became an outlet to express the desires and necessities of the non-heterosexual community in Thailand. The magazine achieved national popularity because of its bizarre and often gay content. It portrayed positive accounts of s and men called "sharks" to view transgender people as legitimate or even preferred sexual partners and started a more accepting public discourse in Thailand. Under the pen name of Phan Thathron he wrote the column "Girls to the Power of 2" that included profiles of s in a glamorous or erotic pose. "Girls to the Power of 2" were the first accounts of  lives based on interviews that allowed their voices to be published in the mainstream press of Thailand. The heterosexual public became more inclined to read about transgender communities that were previously given negative press in Thai newspapers. Go Paknam's philosophy was "kathoeys are good (for men)."

Inside Thailand's Third Gender 
Following contestants participating in one of the largest transgender beauty pageants, known as Miss Tiffany's Universe, the film not only illustrates the process and competition that takes place during the beauty pageant, but also highlights the systems of oppression that take place to target the transgender community in Thailand.

See also 

Anjaree
Bahasa Binan
Femminiello
Gender identities in Thailand
LGBT rights in Thailand
Miss Gay Philippines
Māhū
Muxe
Pandaka
Tamil sexual minorities
Travesti
Third gender

References

External links

 Andrew Matzner, In Legal Limbo: Thailand, Transgender Men, and the Law, 1999. Criticizes the common view that kathoey are fully accepted by Thai society.
 Andrew Matzner, Roses of the North: The Katoey of Chiang Mai University, 1999. Reports on a kathoey "sorority" at Chiang Mai University.
 Transgender Asia including several articles on kathoey
 Where the 'Ladyboys' Are
 Ladyboy: Thailand's Theater of Illusion. Chiang Mai, Cognoscenti Books, 2012. ASIN: B0085S4WQC
Can you tell the difference between Katoeys and real ladies?"
 E.G. Allyn: Trees in the Same Forest, 2002. Description of the gay and kathoey scene of Thailand.
 Chanon Intramart and Eric Allyn, Beautiful Boxer, 2003. Describes the story of Nong Tum.
 The Hermaphrodite World is a film exploring the kathoey culture of Thailand
  Katoey Thai-Ladyboys
  Farrell, James Austin. "The price of change and the right to be a woman in Thailand", Asian Correspondent, 2015-12-14.

 
Gender systems
Thai culture
Third gender
LGBT culture in Thailand
Transgender in Asia
LGBT terminology